Kay Gottschalk (born 12 December 1965) is a German politician of the Alternative for Germany (AfD) and member of the German federal parliament.

Life and politics
Gottschalk was born 1965 in Hamburg and studied business administration and law. He went on to become an insurance manager.

At the 2017 German federal election he was elected member of parliament through a list place in North Rhine-Westphalia.

In December 2017 he was elected as a deputy leader of the AfD. Since 2019 he was married. His husband died on March 1, 2023.

References

1965 births
Living people
Members of the Bundestag 2017–2021
Members of the Bundestag 2021–2025
Members of the Bundestag for the Alternative for Germany
LGBT members of the Bundestag
Gay politicians
German LGBT politicians
21st-century German politicians